Baglan Bay power station is a 525MWe gas-fired power station situated on Baglan Moors just west of Port Talbot in Wales.

History

The power station was built on the site of the former Isopropanol BP chemicals plant in September 2003, costing £300 million. At the time of its development, it was considered the most advanced CCGT (Combined-cycle gas turbine) facility of its kind with close to 60% efficiency .  It was built by the GE Energy division of General Electric, who later rebranded to GE Power then GE Gas Power. It was sold by GE in October 2012 to a group of financial investors, led by Macquarie. After the sale, GE continued to operate the power station under an Operations and Maintenance (O&M) contract until 2019 when staff at the power plant were TUPE transferred to Calon Energy. 

In June 2020 the Baglan Group entered administration and in July 2020 the power station ceased generating electricity.  Power was supplied to the Baglan Energy Park which is home to a large number of other businesses and organisations via the power stations connection to the National Grid. From August 2022, the private wire network is no longer in use and the businesses on the energy park have made arrangements for their own independent power supply.

Specification
It is a CCGT-type power station that runs on natural gas. It has one General Electric 50Hz H-class system (9H) gas turbine which achieves a firing temperature well above 2,600F linked on a single-shaft to a heat recovery steam generator and a GE steam turbine. It has black start capability, using a 33MWe GE LM2500 gas turbine. It connects to the National Grid at 275kV. It is 60% thermally efficient.

Only six H-System combined cycle power plants were built and continue to operate commercially, and while one of those plants — the 60-Hz 7H Gas Turbine based at Inland Empire Energy Center — has achieved notable heat rate and NOx emissions parameters, GE does not offer the H-System anymore. The newest stars of its H-class lineup are its HA models.

Retrofitting the power station with a newer HA model remains technically possible.

See also

 Baglan
 Baglan Bay

References

External links
 General Electric
 Visit by the Queen and Duke and his black eye in October 2004
 Power station opens in 2003
 Planning permission given in 1999

Buildings and structures in Neath Port Talbot
Natural gas-fired power stations in Wales